Steven Garrett MacKinnon  (born September 28, 1966) is a Canadian Liberal politician who was elected to represent the riding of Gatineau in the House of Commons of Canada in the 2015 federal election.

MacKinnon was born in Charlottetown, Prince Edward Island, and studied business at the Université de Moncton and Queen's University.  He served as an advisor to New Brunswick Premier Frank McKenna and Prime Minister Paul Martin, and later served as the Liberal Party of Canada's national director, and as the returning officer for the 2013 federal leadership election.

MacKinnon worked several years for Hill+Knowlton Strategies, a global public relations firm, serving as Senior Vice President and National Practice Leader in the Financial Communications sector.

He first ran for office in the 2011 federal election in Gatineau, finishing third and far behind Françoise Boivin, a former Liberal MP running for the New Democratic Party, and the then-incumbent Bloc Quebecois MP Richard Nadeau.  MacKinnon ran again four years later, this time defeating Boivin, winning by a 2-to-1 margin. Boivin had amassed over sixty-percent of the popular vote in 2011.

Electoral record

References

External links

 Official Website

1966 births
Living people
Liberal Party of Canada MPs
Members of the House of Commons of Canada from Quebec
People from Charlottetown
Politicians from Gatineau
Queen's University at Kingston alumni
Université de Moncton alumni
Canadian political consultants
Anglophone Quebec people
21st-century Canadian politicians
Members of the King's Privy Council for Canada